is a 2007 Japanese science fiction comedy film directed by Yasuo Baba available with English sub-titles. The plot centers on traveling in time from 2006 to 1990 and in the process compares some everyday things between 1990 and 2007 (e.g. cell phones) in a humorous way.

Plot
When inventor Mariko Tanaka (Hiroko Yakushimaru), who works for Hitachi appliances, accidentally re-engineers a washing machine for time travel, the Japanese government then convinces her to go back in time to prevent the passage of a fictitious law that would prevent the usage of real estate as collateral for loans, which was a major cause of the bursting of the Japanese asset price bubble. However, when contact is lost after she goes back in time, the government then sends Isao Shimokawaji (Hiroshi Abe), who works for the Finance Ministry's Emergency Response Bureau to convince Mariko's estranged daughter Mayumi (Ryōko Hirosue), to go back in time to investigate (other ministry officials tried to use the time machine but all they ended up with were faded socks).

Some knowledge of such things as the presence of electronic turnstiles in the Tokyo subway is helpful with some sight-gags.

The film is also notable for the cameo appearances of celebrities who rose to prominence in Japan in the early 90s, including actresses Ai Iijima and Naoko Iijima, announcer Akiko Yagi, and soccer star Ruy Ramos.  Each actor portrays a younger version of themselves.

References

External links

Entry in The Encyclopedia of Science Fiction

2007 films
2007 science fiction films
2007 comedy films
2000s Japanese-language films
Films set in 2006
Films set in 1990
Japanese science fiction comedy films
2000s science fiction comedy films
Films about time travel
2000s Japanese films